A pregnadiene is a diene derivative of a pregnane.

Dienes have two double bonds. The first is usually between carbon 4 and carbon 5 on ring A.

6-ene
The second can be between carbons 6 and 7 on ring B:

1-ene
The second can also be between carbons 1 and 2 on ring A:

References

Pregnanes